Almedia is an unincorporated community in St. Charles Parish, Louisiana, United States.

References

Unincorporated communities in St. Charles Parish, Louisiana
Unincorporated communities in Louisiana
Unincorporated communities in New Orleans metropolitan area